Mircea Axente (born 14 March 1987) is a Romanian former footballer who played as a forward for teams such as FC Politehnica Timișoara, Oțelul Galați, Dinamo București, ASA 2013 Târgu Mureș or SSU Politehnica Timișoara, among others.

Club career

Early career
Axente began his youth career at LPS Galați.

Politehnica Timișoara 
He scored his first goal for FC Timişoara in Europa League game in away 2–1 win at MyPa. Just after few days after his goal in Europa League, he scored his first goal in Liga I for FC Timişoara in 91-minute against Gaz Metan Mediaş making 2–2. Again on 5 August 2010 he scored 1 goal in second leg against MyPa making 1–3 in a dramatic qualifier become an important man for Poli. He scored again against League Champions CFR Cluj in a 3–2 victory. At this moment, he had 12 goals in this season including Friendly Matches. On 26 September 2010 he scored the winning goal against Pandurii Târgu Jiu, ended 1–0.

FCM Reșița 
The younger striker was loaned out at Reșița where impressed, scores 9 goals in 17 appearances. After scoring nine goals in the first half of the season, he was brought back to the club for the rest of the year.

CS Buftea 
This time he was loaned to CS Buftea, who impressed again, scores 9 goals, but this time in 15 appearances.

Gloria Buzău 
Now, he was loaned to first divisioner Gloria where scores at his debut against Oţelul Galaţi.

Oțelul Galați 
He was loaned out again at Oțelul scores five goals, but three of this against his parent team, FC Timişoara. At the end of the season, finally he was promoted to first team at Timișoara.

Dinamo București 
In the summer of 2012, Axente had his contract with Poli Timișoara ended by the Discipline Commission from the Romanian Federation, due to delays in the payments of his salary. Thus, he became a free agent, and signed a contract for four years with Dinamo București.

Viitorul Constanța
In the summer of 2013, Axente became free agent. Then, in August, he signed a contract with Liga I team Viitorul Constanta.

FC Dinamo București
In the summer of 2018, Axente became free agent. Then, after 1 month, he signed a contract with Liga I team FC Dinamo București. On 2 August 2018, Mircea Axente score in Derby Steaua-Dinamo. On 24 January 2019 the contract was terminated.

Honours
Politehnica Timișoara
Liga II: 2011–2012
Dinamo București
Romanian Supercup: 2012
Ermis Aradippou
Cypriot Super Cup: 2014
ASA Târgu Mureș
Romanian Supercup: 2015

References

External links
 
 

1987 births
Living people
People from Tulcea
Romanian footballers
FC Politehnica Timișoara players
FC CFR Timișoara players
CSM Reșița players
LPS HD Clinceni players
FC Gloria Buzău players
ASC Oțelul Galați players
FC Dinamo București players
FC Viitorul Constanța players
Ermis Aradippou FC players
ASA 2013 Târgu Mureș players
Maccabi Netanya F.C. players
CS Gaz Metan Mediaș players
Al-Faisaly FC players
FC Botoșani players
FC Universitatea Cluj players
SSU Politehnica Timișoara players
Liga I players
Liga II players
Cypriot First Division players
Israeli Premier League players
Saudi Professional League players
Expatriate footballers in Cyprus
Expatriate footballers in Israel
Expatriate footballers in Saudi Arabia
Romanian expatriate sportspeople in Cyprus
Romanian expatriate sportspeople in Israel
Romanian expatriate sportspeople in Saudi Arabia
Romanian expatriate footballers
Association football forwards